Savana Island is an islet of the United States Virgin Islands.  It is located off the West End of St. Thomas at 18°20'N 65°05'W, approximately 7 miles west of Cyril E. King Airport. (See also Minor islands of the United States Virgin Islands).

A lighthouse is located on the island.

See also
 List of lighthouses in the United States Virgin Islands

References

Islands of the United States Virgin Islands
Lighthouses in insular areas of the United States
West End, Saint Thomas, U.S. Virgin Islands